Moustapha Seck (born 23 February 1996) is a Senegalese professional footballer who plays as a left back in Portugal for Portimonense.

Club career

Early career
Born in Dakar, Senegal, Seck moved to Barcelona in Spain when he was five years old. He began playing football with his local football club before being picked up by Barcelona in 2005, and spent eight years in the club's Cantera. In 2013, Seck sought a new challenge and elected to follow in the footsteps of compatriot and former Barcelona teammate Keita Baldé and sign for  Serie A side Lazio. At Lazio, Seck played for three seasons between the club's academy and reserve sides and won three titles before being released in 2016 following contractual disagreements with management.

Roma
Following the expiration of his contract with Lazio, Seck signed as a free-agent for local rivals Roma. On 9 December 2016, manager Luciano Spalletti handed him his debut in a 0–0 Europa League draw with Astra.

Loans to Carpi and Empoli
On the deadline day of the January 2017 transfer window, Seck agreed to join Serie B side Carpi on loan for the remainder of the season. He described the move as being the "right preparation" for him to achieve his goal of representing Senegal at the 2018 FIFA World Cup. He made his debut for the club on 5 February, coming on as a second-half substitute for Slovenian international Enej Jelenič in a 2–1 loss to Cesena. Seck ultimately made three appearances on loan at Carpi before returning to Roma at the end of the season. 

In July the following year, Seck signed for recently-relegated Serie B side Empoli on a season-long loan. He made his debut in a 2–2 Coppa Italia penalty shootout loss to Renate.

Loan to Almere City
On 22 July 2018, Seck joined Eerste Divisie club Almere City on loan until 30 June 2019.

Loan to Livorno
On 31 January 2020, he was loaned to Serie B club Livorno.

Career statistics

Club

References

External links
 

1996 births
Footballers from Dakar
Living people
Senegalese footballers
Senegalese expatriate footballers
Association football defenders
FC Barcelona players
S.S. Lazio players
A.S. Roma players
A.C. Carpi players
Empoli F.C. players
Novara F.C. players
Almere City FC players
U.S. Livorno 1915 players
Leixões S.C. players
Portimonense S.C. players
Serie B players
Eerste Divisie players
Liga Portugal 2 players
Primeira Liga players
Senegalese emigrants to Spain
Senegalese expatriate sportspeople in Italy
Senegalese expatriate sportspeople in the Netherlands
Senegalese expatriate sportspeople in Portugal
Expatriate footballers in Italy
Expatriate footballers in the Netherlands
Expatriate footballers in Portugal